The Ghana Davis Cup team represents Ghana in Davis Cup tennis competition and are governed by the Ghana Tennis Association. They have not competed since 2015.

They competed in Group I in 1990.

History
Ghana competed in its first Davis Cup in 1988.

Current team (2022) 

 Isaac Nortey
 Samuel Agbesi Osei Antwi
 Johnson Acquah
 Reginald Nii Okai Ocantey
 Frederick Egyir (Captain-player)

See also
Davis Cup

External links

Davis Cup teams
Davis Cup
Davis Cup